Monostegia is a genus of sawfly. The authority is based on the description by Achille Costa and Oronzio Costa, although earlier work grants this to Fabricius 1798., though the commonest species, M. abdominalis, bears the authority of Fabricius.

Description 
Adults: Head and thorax are black, with some yellow parts including mouthparts. Legs and abdomen mainly yellow, wings suffused with brown.   Eggs: Smooth, white and oblong measuring 1 mm by 4 mm. Larvae: Caterpillar-like, growing from 2–4 mm to 16–21 mm. Pupae: Shorter and fatter measuring 8 mm in length, and become increasingly melanized.

Taxonomy 
Species often include only M. abdominalis but some authorities describe up to four species, including;
 Monostegia abdominalis A. Costa 1859 (Fabricius 1798) - Tiny yellow sawfly
 Monostegia analis Konow 1887
 Monostegia cingula Konow 1891
 Monostegia nigra Konow 1896

Distribution 
Distribution is holarctic, from Europe to Asia Minor and the Caucasus in the south, through to Siberia. Though it was only introduced to North America from Europe in the 1950s, where it naturalised, its range continues to expand. In 1979 its North American distribution was from Quebec to New Jersey, and west to Ontario and Ohio but was detected as far west as Washington state in 2016 in the United States and in Canada from Alberta in the west to the Maritimes in the east.

Economic importance 

Sawflys are folivore phytophages (plant eating). Monostegia'''s economic importance lies in the destructive habits of its caterpillar-like larvae which feed on the leaves of plants of the family Primulaceae, principally Lysimachia (such as yellow loosestrife, (Lysimachia terrestris)), and Anagallis (pimpernel).  Original reports in North America involved Lysimachia nummularia as the host plant, but L. terrestris'' was identified in the 1960s.

Life cycle 
Two (bivoltine) to three (multivoltine) generations per year occur, depending on the length of the summer season, with some larvae over wintering, otherwise the larvae mature in July, emerging from the soil as adults in August. Larvae that winter in the soil pupate in the spring to emerge in June.

Adults are thelyotokous, females being produced from unfertilised eggs, and males are rare. The emerging female alights the underside of leaves at the top of the host plant, and contain 30–70 eggs, which they deposit over the space of about a week, and live for about a further week. the female penetrates the leaf with her ovipositor, depositing the eggs into the cavity, usually two at a time, moving from the distal leaf towards the stem, forming an egg cluster of between 6 and 16 eggs.

The eggs are laid on the leaves of the host plant, and the immature larvae ( first instar) remain with the clusters of eggs for a day before dispersing and feeding on the underside of the leaves. One larva can consume a whole plant, migrating to a new plant after total defoliation. The mature larva (sixth instar) stops feeding and drops to the soil where it burrows and pupates.

References

Bibliography

 , in 
 
 
 
 , in 
 
 
 
 
 
 
 
 
 
 , in 
 
 , in

Websites 

 
 
 
 
 

Tenthredinidae
Taxa named by Oronzio Gabriele Costa